Ernest Hillier Chocolates is an Australian chocolatier. Founded in 1914, it is Australia's first chocolate manufacturer, and its oldest privately owned chocolatier is still in operation.

The company is headquartered in Melbourne, Victoria, and produces over six hundred chocolate products.

History
Ernest Hillier moved from England to San Francisco, California, United States, in the early 1900s to learn the confectionery and soda trade. There, he and his Australian-born wife, Magdalen May, opened several restaurants; however, the majority of their establishments were destroyed in the 1906 San Francisco earthquake.

The Hilliers subsequently moved to Sydney, Australia, in 1906, where Hillier began a sequence of Australian firsts. In 1911, he opened the first soda fountain in Australia, "Hillier Refreshment Services", at the Imperial Skating Rink.

Because of the success of the soda fountain, Hillier was put in charge of catering at the amusement park at Rushcutters Bay, New South Wales. That same year he also looked after Gaut's refreshment service and a fountain shop in George Street, opposite the Central Railway Station.

In 1914, Hillier opened his chocolatier business, providing locally made chocolate. Prior to this, all chocolate in Australia had to be imported from the U.S. and Europe. Because of the distance and climatic conditions, together with transport restrictions, the chocolate always arrived in poor condition.

In the wake of the Great Depression, chocolate sales dramatically declined in Sydney; in response, Hillier moved his business to Melbourne, Victoria.

Hillier eventually sold the business later in life.

In October 2000, Hillier purchased Australian confectionery company Newman's.

Financial Problems

Suffering financial distress, Hillier was sold to Re:Capital in 2014. The firm were unable to turn the chocolatier around and placed it in to voluntary administration in January 2015, citing rising cocoa prices and increased competition.

Hillier emerged from administration in mid-2015 and as of March 2016, was still producing chocolates from its Coburg North factory.

See also

 List of companies of Australia

References

External links
 Official website

20th-century establishments in Australia
21st century in Australia
Australian chocolate companies
Brand name chocolate
Food and drink companies based in Melbourne
Manufacturing companies based in Melbourne
Privately held companies of Australia
Food and drink companies established in 1914
1914 establishments in Australia
Chocolateries